Meg Johnson (born 30 September 1936) is an English actress. 

Johnson is known for her roles on various British television soap operas, including Eunice Gee on Coronation Street, Brigid McKenna on Brookside and Pearl Ladderbanks on Emmerdale. Alongside her television roles, Johnson has also appeared in various stage productions, including Chicago and Follies.

Career
Johnson's first professional acting role occurred in 1961, when she was aged 25 in a TV series titled Family Solicitor Subsequent roles included The Referees (1961) and Here's Harry (1961–1964). 

Johnson first appeared in a few guest episodes of the ITV television soap opera Coronation Street in 1976 as Brenda Holden, before being cast as Eunice Gee in 1981, a role she would play with recurring appearances until 1999.

In the 1980s Johnson worked several times with Victoria Wood, appearing in several episodes of her shows Victoria Wood: As Seen on TV as well as Victoria Wood Presents.

In 1997, she appeared in the West End theatre revival of Chicago as Mama Morton. She has also appeared in theatre productions of Follies and Gypsy. 

Then from 2000 to 2003, she appeared in the Channel 4 soap opera Brookside as Brigid McKenna. 

Later in 2003, Johnson was cast as Pearl Ladderbanks in the ITV soap opera Emmerdale, a role she portrayed until March 2020.

Personal life
Johnson was married to English actor and Granada ITV television presenter Charles Foster until his death in February 2023. Foster was well-known for also appering in TV soap opera's Coronation Street and Emmerdale, before becoming an announcer at North West Granada in the 1970s, we has also been a voiceover on game show like Catch Phrase

References

External links

1936 births
Living people
English stage actresses
English television actresses
English soap opera actresses
Actresses from Manchester